Things Change is a 1988 American comedy-drama film directed by David Mamet and starring Joe Mantegna and Don Ameche. It was co-written by Mamet and Shel Silverstein.

Plot
Gino, a humble shoe-shiner in Chicago, is approached by Mafia Don "Mr. Green", who offers him a large sum of money to take the blame for a murder committed by another gangster. When he refuses, the don starts to order what may be a hit on him. Gino then agrees, planning to buy a fishing boat with the money he will earn after a three-year sentence. He signs a confession and allows his fingerprints to be put on the murder weapon.

While preparing for his court confession, Gino is watched over by Jerry, a bottom-rung gangster who has recently gotten into trouble for failing to follow orders. Facing a boring stay at a local hotel and faced with Gino's inability to suggest recreations he would like for his last few days of freedom, Jerry decides to give Gino a weekend to remember in Lake Tahoe before he goes to prison.

Arriving at the resort and casino, Jerry's tall tales and Gino's quiet dignity immediately get Gino mistaken for a powerful mafioso, resulting in them being treated as VIPs. However, they are then summoned to the Nevada home of Joseph 'Don Giuseppe' Vincent, where a frantic Jerry is certain that their lowly status will be found out. However, Don Giuseppe takes a liking to Gino and the two elderly Sicilians bond.

Narrowly escaping after Mr. Green turns up at Vincenzo's home as part of a mafia meeting, a relieved Jerry manages to get Gino back to Chicago safely. Jerry, who has become sympathetic to Gino, now urges Gino to flee but he refuses to break his word. However, on the day Gino is to confess in court, Jerry discovers that his superiors were merely stalling for time; Gino is to be killed, and Jerry is to be the one who does the killing. Instead, Gino calls Don Giuseppe, taking him up on his promise to do anything to help Gino due to their friendship. Mr. Green's henchman Frankie is shown pleading guilty to the crime and receives a 20-year sentence. Jerry begins working with Gino, shining shoes.

Cast

Film connections
Things Change was Mamet's directorial follow-up to House of Games and also takes place in the world of crime. The two films share many cast members, including Joe Mantegna, Ricky Jay, Mike Nussbaum, William H. Macy (credited as W.H. Macy), and J. T. Walsh, as well as many production staff members. In addition, other recurring collaborators from Mamet's resident ensemble at Atlantic Theatre Company appeared in the film, including Felicity Huffman and Clark Gregg.

Awards
Co-stars Mantegna and Ameche received Volpi Cups at the Venice Film Festival for their performances in the film.

Release and reception 
Things Change was released on October 21, 1988, in 99 U.S. theaters, grossing US$3.5 million.  The film carries an 85% rating on Rotten Tomatoes from 13 reviews, with an average score of 7/10.

See also 
List of American films of 1988

References

External links 
 
 
 

1988 films
1980s crime comedy-drama films
American crime comedy-drama films
Columbia Pictures films
1980s English-language films
Films directed by David Mamet
Films set in Chicago
Films about gambling
Works by Shel Silverstein
Films with screenplays by David Mamet
1980s American films